Commissioned in 1985 AD at Nadipur in Pokhara, Nepal, Seti Hydropower Station has an installed capacity of 1.5 MW. Water from the Seti Gandaki River is dammed to provide electricity which is later used for irrigation.

See also
List of power stations in Nepal

References

Hydroelectric power stations in Nepal
Buildings and structures in Pokhara